The Open Charge Point Protocol (OCPP) is an application protocol for communication between Electric vehicle (EV) charging stations and a central management system, also known as a charging station network, similar to cell phones and cell phone networks. The original version was written by Joury de Reuver and Franc Buve.

The latest version is version 2.0. (OCPP versions)

The protocol is an initiative of the ELaadNL foundation in the Netherlands. Its aim was to create an open application protocol which allows EV charging stations and central management systems from different vendors to communicate with each other. It is in use by a large number of vendors of EV charging stations and central management systems all over the world.

Benefits
Charging station owners, or hosts, are less vulnerable to individual system suppliers if a charging station manufacturer ceased to exist, the host could switch to another OCPP-based network. Giving charging station customers choice and flexibility to use any network on any charging station would, through market forces, encourage charging station manufacturers and network providers to compete on price, service, product features, and innovation – all of which encourages demand by charging station owners. The end result is a significant benefit to EV drivers as the charging station infrastructure expands.

OCPP also makes it easier to create a large-scale, visible network that uses a range of different charging stations since there is a requirement for only one operating system. Proponents of OCPP also cite a reduction in development costs since software designed to provide additional functionality would only need to be developed once and not several times to fit with each individual operating system. OCPP will also ease interoperability across the United States, and elsewhere, and minimize remedial work on systems.

The security part of OCPP defines an end-to-end security design architecture, with implementation guidelines for both charging stations and Central Management System. It was first introduced in 2018 and now is in its third revision.  Correct implementation of the OCPP Security guidelines can protect against some of the more common attack scenarios including server hijack, communications eavesdropping and charging station impersonation.

OCPP Certification Process 
The Open Charge Alliance - OCA has launched an independent OCPP certification program, through which the charging point (EVSE) manufacturers and Charging Station Management System providers (CSMS / back office) are now able to conform their OCPP 1.6 implementations according to the official OCPP specification. A separate security certification which validates the conformance to the OCPP 1.6 security white-paper is also available.   

This certification program will help the EVSE manufactures & CSMS platform to exhibit a clear status of their OCPP implementation to their clients. Likewise, it will also be beneficial for the consumers of the OCPP products without a need to test & validate the implementation themselves.  

For now only OCPP 1.6 can be fully tested and certified. OCPP versions older than OCPP 1.6 (such as OCPP 0.7, OCPP 1.2, and OCPP 1.5) as well OCPP 2.0 are not covered under the current OCPP certification program. Open Charge Alliance has defined a set of test procedures and test plans for the certification compliance. The actual tests are performed by independent testing laboratories. So far, OCA has selected three laboratories DNV-GL, KSGA and Dekra, which are present in North America, Europe and in Asia.

To become OCPP certified, the tested Device Under Test (DUT), must successfully pass the following two categories of tests:

1. Conformance tests: the tested DUT is tested against the OCPP Compliance Testing Tool. The tool has built in validations that should not fail during certification tests. With these validations the Tool verifies whether the DUT has implemented the OCPP specification correctly.

2. Performance measurements: several performance values of the tested DUT are measured and give an idea how the device behaves in a lab environment. The performance parameters are stated by the vendor in the Protocol Implementation Conformance Statement (PICS).

A list of OCPP certified companies and products can be found on the Open Charge Alliance (OCA) website. Only certified companies are allowed to use the certification logos.

Use in the United States
To date, OCPP is not as highly adopted in the U.S. among other vendors because the U.S. market came into being largely through a number of large U.S. Department of Energy (DOE) grants that let the network provider choose their protocol.

The U.S. Department of Energy made charging station network interoperability a priority in 2013 by launching a new center that will work to ensure that vehicles, charging stations, communications and networking systems work in unison with the electric grid. The Electric Vehicle-Smart Grid Interoperability Center, located at Argonne National Laboratory just outside Chicago, works to harmonize emerging EV and smart grid technologies.

See also
 IEC 63110
 Payment gateway

References

External links
Open Charge Alliance

Electric vehicle technologies